Tympanocryptis houstoni, also known as Houston's earless dragon or Nullarbor earless dragon, is one of a documented species of a relatively small dragon belonging to the genus Tympanocryptis.

Habitat 
This terrestrial species is found in the low, arid shrublands, and saltbush and bluebush flatlands of South Australia and Western Australia. It occupies chenopod shrublands on clay soils of the Nullarbor Plain.

Description 
Snout-to-vent length is 6 cm on average.

Etymology 
Tympanocryptis: 'hidden ear'
Houstoni: Presumably named after T.E. Houston, author of Dragon lizards and Goannas of South Australia and the first to recognise the distinctiveness of this taxon.

References

Reptiles described in 1982
housoni

Taxa named by Glen Milton Storr